St. Aloysius Catholic Church may refer to:

United Kingdom 
St. Aloysius Catholic Church (Liverpool), England
St Aloysius Church, Glasgow, Scotland
Oxford Oratory Church of St Aloysius Gonzaga, England

United States 
St. Aloysius Church (Pewee Valley, Kentucky)
St. Aloysius' Catholic Church (Carthagena, Ohio)
St. Aloysius of Gonzaga Church, Nashua, New Hampshire
St. Aloysius Church (Spokane, Washington)
St. Aloysius Catholic Church (New York City)
St. Aloysius Church (Washington, D.C.)